Fahd Hariri (born 1980/1981) is a Lebanese billionaire heir and property developer, the youngest son of Rafic Hariri.

Early life
Fahd Hariri was born in Riyadh, Saudi Arabia the youngest son of Rafic Hariri. In 2004, he graduated from the École Spéciale d'Architecture in Paris.

Career
He develops residential properties, mostly in Beirut. He is also president of the Har Investment Fund, and a member of the advisory council at Lutetia Capital SAS, Paris.

As of November 2018, Forbes estimated his net worth at US$1.2 billion.

Personal life
He is married and has three children. He lives in London, England.

References

1980s births
Living people
Fahd
Lebanese billionaires
Lebanese businesspeople
Saudi Arabian people of Lebanese descent
Lebanese people of Palestinian descent
École Spéciale d'Architecture alumni